Curtis Samuel (born August 11, 1996) is an American football wide receiver for the Washington Commanders of the National Football League (NFL). He played college football at Ohio State, where he was a member of the team that won the 2015 College Football Playoff National Championship and was an All-American in 2016. Samuel was drafted by the Carolina Panthers in the second round of the 2017 NFL Draft and played four seasons with them before joining Washington in 2021.

Early years
Samuel attended Erasmus Hall High School in Brooklyn, New York, where he played as a running back for the Dutchmen football team and also ran track. As a junior, Samuel averaged 11.5 yards per carry while rushing for 1,047 yards and 13 touchdowns. Named New York Daily News city player of the year in 2012. In track, he won the 55 meters at the New York State track and field championships with a blistering time of 6.44 seconds. In addition to his success as a running back, he also scored three receiving touchdowns and two punt return touchdowns. In his senior year Samuel averaged 15.8 yards per rush for 1,461 yards and 17 touchdowns. He was named the 2013 New York Gatorade Player of the Year and was invited to All-American Bowl.

College career
A 4-star recruit, Samuel committed to play college football for the Ohio State Buckeyes. He contributed in the 2014–2016 seasons under head coach Urban Meyer. In the 2014 season, he had 58 carries for 383 rushing yards and six rushing touchdowns to go along with 11 receptions for 95 receiving yards.

In the 2015 season, he had 17 carries for 132 rushing yards and one rushing touchdown to go along with 22 receptions for 289 receiving yards and two receiving touchdowns.

In the 2016 season, he had 97 carries for 771 rushing yards and eight rushing touchdowns to go along with 74 receptions for 865 receiving yards and seven receiving touchdowns. He was awarded first-team All-Big Ten and All-American honors. Samuel is the only player in Ohio State history to ever gain over 1,000 career yards in both rushing and receiving.

Statistics

Professional career

Carolina Panthers

2017
Samuel was selected by the Carolina Panthers in the second round (40th overall) of the 2017 NFL Draft. On May 5, 2017, the Panthers signed Samuel to a four-year, $6.45 million contract with $4.05 million guaranteed and a signing bonus of $2.83 million.

On September 17, 2017, in Week 2, Samuel had his first two career receptions, which went for seven yards, in a 9–3 victory over the Buffalo Bills. In Week 3, against the New Orleans Saints, he recorded a 31-yard rush on an end-around. On November 14, 2017, Samuel's rookie season abruptly ended after he suffered a left ankle injury during Monday Night Football against the Miami Dolphins in Week 10, in which the Panthers announced that his ankle would have surgery. He was placed on injured reserve on November 24, 2017. Overall, in his rookie season, he finished with 15 receptions for 115 receiving yards to go along with four carries for 64 rushing yards in nine games.

2018
In the 2018 season, Samuel scored his first career touchdown on October 7 against the New York Giants. Overall, he finished the 2018 season with 39 receptions for 494 receiving yards and five receiving touchdowns. In addition, he had 84 rushing yards and two rushing touchdowns on eight carries.

2019
In Week 3 of the 2019 season against the Arizona Cardinals, Samuel caught five passes for 53 yards and his first receiving touchdown of the season in the 38–20 win. Overall, in the 2019 season, he had 54 receptions for 627 receiving yards and six receiving touchdowns to go along with 19 carries for 130 rushing yards and one rushing touchdown.

2020
In Week 9, against the Kansas City Chiefs, Samuel had nine receptions for 105 receiving yards and one receiving touchdown in the 33–31 loss. In Week 11 against the Detroit Lions, Samuel recorded 8 catches for 70 yards, including the first touchdown pass thrown by quarterback P. J. Walker during the 20–0 win. He was placed on the reserve/COVID-19 list by the Panthers on December 7, 2020, and activated on December 11. In Week 17 against the New Orleans Saints, Samuel recorded seven catches for a season high 118 yards during the 33–7 loss. He finished the 2020 season with 77 receptions for 851 receiving yards and three receiving touchdowns to go along with 41 carries for 200 rushing yards and two rushing touchdowns.

Washington Football Team / Commanders

2021
Samuel signed a three-year, $34.5 million contract with the Washington Football Team on March 18, 2021. By signing with the Commanders, he was reunited with his college roommate, Terry McLaurin. He was placed on the active/physically unable to perform (PUP) list at the start of training camp due to a groin injury before he was placed on the COVID-19 reserve list two days in. He returned to the PUP list on August 9 and was placed back to the active roster on August 15. Samuel tweaked his groin in practice just days before the opening game of the season and was placed on injured reserve. Samuel returned to the active roster on October 1, 2021.

2022
In the 2022 season opening win over the Jacksonville Jaguars, Samuel recorded 55 receiving yards off eight receptions, 17 rushing yards, and his first touchdown reception for Washington. The next game, he followed up with seven receptions for 78 yards, 21 rushing yards, and a receiving touchdown against the Detroit Lions. Samuel played in the entirety of the 17 game season and was occasionally used as a running back as well as a wide receiver. He finished the year with 64 receptions for 646 yards and four receiving touchdowns as well as 38 rushing attempts for 187 yards and one rushing touchdown.

Statistics

References

External links

Washington Commanders bio
Ohio State Buckeyes bio

1996 births
Living people
Sportspeople from Brooklyn
Players of American football from New York City
American football wide receivers
American football running backs
Ohio State Buckeyes football players
Carolina Panthers players
Washington Commanders players
Washington Football Team players
Erasmus Hall High School alumni
African-American players of American football
21st-century African-American sportspeople